Western Colorado Community College (WCCC) is a division of Colorado Mesa University in Grand Junction, Colorado specializing in vocational studies. Unlike other institutions deemed "community college," WCCC is not a separate entity from its parent institution. A student takes core curriculum courses at CMU but completes his or her program of study at WCCC. Associate degrees from WCCC are awarded by Colorado Mesa University.

Facts
The official name of the grounds where WCCC is located is now known as the Bishop Campus. 
WCCC is composed of six buildings—Youngblood Building, Building B, Bishop Health Sciences, Archuleta Center, Archuleta Center B, and School District 51's Valley School—all located entirely on the Bishop Campus. There is a South Campus, located about five miles away, which houses the Electrical Lineman program.

History
Prior to 2006, WCCC was called the Tilman M. Bishop Unified Technical Education Campus or UTEC.

External links
Western Colorado Community College official web site 
Colorado Mesa University official web site

Two-year colleges in the United States
Colorado Mesa University
Grand Junction, Colorado
Education in Mesa County, Colorado
Colorado Western Slope
Colorado Community College System